"Hey Baby" is a song recorded by the Belgian DJ duo Dimitri Vegas & Like Mike and American producer/musician Diplo, featuring vocals from Deb's Daughter. The single gave the duo their second number one and the first for both Diplo and Deb's Daughter in the United States, where it topped the Billboard Dance Club Songs in its 29 April 2017 issue.

Track listing

Charts

Weekly charts

Year-end charts

See also
 List of number-one dance singles of 2017 (U.S.)
List of Ultratop 50 number-one singles of 2016
List of Ultratop 50 number-one singles of 2017

References

External links
 

2016 songs
2017 singles
Songs written by Diplo
Ultratop 50 Singles (Flanders) number-one singles
Dimitri Vegas & Like Mike songs